The Cape Government Railways 3rd Class 4-4-0 of 1898 was a South African steam locomotive from the pre-Union era in the Cape of Good Hope.

In 1898, the Cape Government Railways placed six 3rd Class Wynberg Tender locomotives with a 4-4-0 American type wheel arrangement in service. They were intended for passenger service on the suburban lines in Cape Town.

Simon's Town line
The original 1864 suburban line from Salt River to Wynberg was extended to Muizenberg in 1882, to Kalkbaai  in 1883 and all the way to Simon's Town in 1890.

The resulting increase in suburban traffic led to a requirement for more locomotives, while the additional distance to be covered necessitated the introduction of larger and more powerful locomotives with a larger fuel and water capacity than that of the existing 2nd Class  Wynberg Tanks of 1882.

Manufacturer

Cape Government Railways (CGR) Chief Locomotive Superintendent Michael Stephens retired in 1895. Shortly after being appointed as his successor in 1896, H.M. Beatty drew up detailed designs for a new  passenger locomotive for suburban service in Cape Town.

For his first locomotive design as Chief Locomotive Superintendent, Beatty decided on a larger version of the 3rd Class  which had been introduced on the CGR in 1889. An order for six of these engines was placed with Neilson and Company in Glasgow. The locomotives were delivered in 1898, numbered in the range from 12 to 17.

The locomotives became known as the Wynberg Tenders. They were designed with reverse running in mind, with a weatherboard mounted on the tender front to protect the crew from the elements when running tender first and with a cowcatcher and headlight mounted on the rear end of the tender.

Service
When the Union of South Africa was established on 31 May 1910, the three Colonial government railways (CGR, Natal Government Railways and Central South African Railways) were united under a single administration to control and administer the railways, ports and harbours of the Union. Although the South African Railways and Harbours came into existence in 1910, the actual classification and renumbering of all the rolling stock of the three constituent railways were only implemented with effect from 1 January 1912.

In 1912, the locomotives were considered obsolete by the SAR, designated Class 03 and renumbered by having the numeral "0" prefixed to their existing numbers. In SAR service, they continued to work suburban trains. Two of them, numbers 015 and 016, were scrapped in 1916 but, despite being considered obsolete, the other four survived in service until after 1931.

They remained working on the Simon's Town line until the trains became too heavy for them. They were then used to work the Malmesbury line until they were withdrawn from service.

Works numbers
The works numbers, original numbers and renumbering of the Cape 3rd Class of 1898 are listed in the table.

References

0290
0290
4-4-0 locomotives
2′B n2 locomotives
Neilson locomotives
Cape gauge railway locomotives
Railway locomotives introduced in 1898
1898 in South Africa
Scrapped locomotives